The Battle of Melrose was a Scottish clan battle that took place on 25 July 1526. Walter Scott of Branxholme and Buccleuch attempted to rescue the young James V of Scotland from the powerful Archibald Douglas, 6th Earl of Angus.

Background

Guardianship of the young James V of Scotland had been secured by Archibald Douglas, 6th Earl of Angus in what was supposed to be a three monthly arrangement whereby each of the four members of the Council of Regency would care for James. However, Douglas refused to hand James over to the Earl of Arran whose turn it was next. James sent a message out to Sir Walter Scott asking him to launch a rescue attempt. The young King James, while being escorted on a journey to Edinburgh by Douglas was intercepted by a large body of Border Reivers led by Sir Walter Scott at Melrose.

Battle

Angus's force mainly consisted of Kerrs and stood its ground, managing to drive off the attackers. Scott led as many as 1000 men down Eildon Hill at Melrose. Angus’s men charged and Scott’s men stood their ground also. However, the Lord Hume arrived with a reinforcement of 80 Kerrs to support Angus, they attacked the wing of Scott's force afresh, and the Scotts and Eliotts began to fall back and run. During the pursuit Andrew Kerr of Cessford was killed by one of the Eliotts. Scott lost about 80 of his men while the Earl of Angus lost about 100, but still won the battle.

Aftermath

The young King James stayed at Darnick Tower on the night following the battle and proceeded to Edinburgh the next day. In the aftermath of the Battle of Melrose a deadly feud raged for many years in the Scottish Borders between the Kerrs and Scotts due to the death of Andrew Kerr, Laird of Cessford at the battle. On 4 September 1526 the Battle of Linlithgow Bridge took place where once again anti-Douglas forces attempted to rescue the young King James from the Earl of Angus.

References

External links

The Battle of Melrose bolb.org.uk. (Article about the Battle of Melrose on website about the later Battle of Linlithgow Bridge).

Conflicts in 1526
1526 in Scotland
16th-century Scottish clan battles

Battle of Melrose